Jean-Baptiste de Poussin (died 1749) was a French diplomat and a Knight of Order of Saints Maurice and Lazarus.

De Poussin was sent by the French Crown as a secret envoy to London, before postings to Copenhagen (from 1702) and Hamburg (from 1714).

References

1749 deaths
University of Paris alumni
Ambassadors of France to the United Kingdom
Knights of the Order of Saints Maurice and Lazarus
18th-century French diplomats
French expatriates in the Kingdom of England
French expatriates in Denmark
French expatriates in Germany